Ahmed Afifi (born May 24, 1993) is an Egyptian professional footballer who plays as a winger for Petrojet SC in the Egyptian Premier League. In 2016, El Gouna refused to sell him and accepted a loan to Aswan for one season. Afifi joined Pyramids FC (then known as Al-Assiouty Sport) in 2017 in a free transfer from El Gouna and signed a 2-year contract.

References

1993 births
Living people
Egyptian footballers
Egyptian Premier League players
Association football midfielders
Petrojet SC players
Pyramids FC players
Aswan SC players
El Gouna FC players